Nicolaas de Jong (10 June 1887 – 14 July 1966) was a Dutch cyclist. He competed in two events at the 1920 Summer Olympics.

See also
 List of Dutch Olympic cyclists

References

External links
 

1887 births
1966 deaths
Dutch male cyclists
Olympic cyclists of the Netherlands
Cyclists at the 1920 Summer Olympics
People from Sloten, North Holland
Cyclists from North Holland
20th-century Dutch people